Davis Creek is a tributary of the Lynn River, which empties into Lake Erie, and Port Rowan.
It drains .  Unlike nearby Kent Creek, Davis Creek is poorly covered by forests.

References

Long Point Region Conservation Authority
Rivers of Ontario
 
Landforms of Norfolk County, Ontario